Amani Corvelle Hooker (born June 14, 1998) is an American football strong safety for the Tennessee Titans of the National Football League (NFL). He played college football at Iowa.

Early years
Hooker attended Park Center Senior High School in Brooklyn Park, Minnesota. He committed to the University of Iowa to play college football.

College career
Hooker played at Iowa from 2016 to 2018. During his career, he had 125 tackles, six interceptions, one sack, and one touchdown. As a junior in 2018, he was the Tatum-Woodson Big Ten Defensive Back of the Year after recording 65 tackles, four interceptions, and one sack. Hooker skipped his senior year to enter the 2019 NFL Draft.

Professional career

Hooker was drafted by the Tennessee Titans in the fourth round (116th overall) of the 2019 NFL Draft. On May 15, 2019, he signed a four-year rookie contract worth $3,253,481, with a $733,481 signing bonus and a 2019 cap hit of $678,370.

On September 14, 2021, Hooker was placed on injured reserve after suffering a foot injury in Week 1. He was activated on October 18 prior to Week 6.

On September 9, 2022, Hooker signed a three-year, $33 million contract extension with the Titans.

Personal life
His brother, Quinton, is a professional basketball player who was named Minnesota Mr. Basketball in 2013.

References

External links
Iowa Hawkeyes bio
Tennessee Titans bio

1998 births
Living people
Players of American football from Minneapolis
American football safeties
Iowa Hawkeyes football players
Tennessee Titans players